Miss Queen Korea is a national beauty pageant responsible for selecting South Korea's representative to the Miss Universe and Miss World pageant.

History
 In 1957 the first Miss Korea competition took place in 1957 and was sponsored by the Korean newspaper Hankook Ilbo. In 1959, Hankook Ilbo sent first Miss World contestant who represents Korea. The winner of Miss Korea traditionally competed at the Miss Universe between 1957 and 2015, 1st runner-up of Miss Korea competed Miss World between 1959 and 2010. In 2011 the new pageant comes from Park Jeong-ah pageant and holds a pageant, Miss World Korea competition, later Park launched Miss Universe Korea pageant in 2016, Miss Supranational franchise in 2017.
 The first edition of "Miss Queen Korea", three titles go to Grand slam pageants: Miss Universe, Miss World, Miss Supranational; the main winner goes to Miss Universe.
Began 2022 the Miss Queen Korea took over the Miss Universe and Miss World only.

International crowns 

 One – Miss Supranational winner: 
Jenny Kim (2017)' Titleholders  

Titleholders under Miss Queen Korea org.
Miss Universe KoreaSince 2016 the Miss Queen Korea took over the license of Miss Universe Organization. The main winner of Miss Queen Korea represents South Korea at Miss Universe pageant. On occasion, when the winner does not qualify (due to age) for either contest, a runner-up is sent.Miss Korea 1957-2015South Korea debuted at Miss Universe in 1954 from Miss Korea pageant. The main winner was sent to Miss Universe by the organization between 1954 and 2015, and the 1st Runner-up position in 1988 from Jang Yoon-jeong is the highest achievement in Miss Universe history. Started in 2016 the license moved on Miss Queen Korea hand.Miss World KoreaThe second winner of Miss Queen Korea crowned Miss World Korea title. the titleholder will be replaced when annual pageant postponed or suspended. Before 2011 the 1st runner-up of Miss Korea traditionally represented South Korea at Miss World pageant.Past titleholders under Miss Queen Korea org.
Miss Supranational KoreaThe third winner of Miss Queen Korea crowned Miss Supranational Korea title. Until 2021 the organization sent Korean representatives at Miss Supranational pageant. Began 2022 the license handed to Mister International Korea which also selected Korean representation at Mister Supranational pageant under Miss Supranational Management.''

See also
Miss Korea
Miss Grand Korea 
Mister World Korea
Mister International Korea

References

External links
 
 
 
 

 

 
Korea
Korea 
Miss Universe Korea
Recurring events established in 2011
Annual events in South Korea